Song of Old Wyoming is a 1945 American Western film directed by Robert Emmett Tansey.  It was shot in Cinecolor and released by Producers Releasing Corporation. Western star Lash LaRue debuted in this film playing the Cheyenne Kid (Eddie Dean's sidekick in the film.)

Cast 
Eddie Dean as Eddie
Sarah Padden as Kate 'Ma' Conway
Ian Keith as Lee Landow
Lash LaRue as Cheyenne Kid (billed as Al LaRue)
Jennifer Holt as Vicky Conway, adopted
Emmett Lynn as Uncle Ezra
Robert Barron as Jesse Dixon
Gene Alsace as Henchman Ringo
Don Williams as Cowhand Slim – Musician
Johnny Carpenter as Cowhand Buck
Horace Murphy as Editor Timothy Meeks

Soundtrack 
 Eddie Dean – "Hills of Old Wyoming" (Written by Ralph Rainger and Leo Robin)
 Eddie Dean – "My Herdin' Song" (Written by Eddie Dean and Milt Mabie)
 Eddie Dean – "Wild Prairie Rose" (Written by Eddie Dean and Carl Hoefle)

External links 

1945 films
1940s English-language films
Producers Releasing Corporation films
1945 Western (genre) films
Cinecolor films
American Western (genre) films
Films directed by Robert Emmett Tansey
1940s American films